Sandra Wollner (born 1983) is an Austrian film director and screenwriter. She made her feature directorial debut with The Impossible Picture (2016), and also directed and co-wrote The Trouble with Being Born (2020).

Education and career
In 2012, Wollner began studying documentary filmmaking at the Film Academy Baden-Württemberg. She has directed several short films, and directed her first feature film, The Impossible Picture (2016), while still a student at the Film Academy Baden-Württemberg. The Impossible Picture garnered a number of awards, including the German Film Critics' Award in 2019.

Wollner directed and co-wrote The Trouble with Being Born, which premiered at the 70th Berlin International Film Festival in 2020, as part of the festival's Encounters section. The film received the Special Jury Award in that section.

References

External links
 

Austrian women film directors
Austrian women screenwriters
People from Leoben
1983 births
Living people